Fulvetta is a genus of passerine birds. Originally proposed in 1877, it was recently reestablished for the typical fulvettas, which were long included with their presumed relatives in the Timaliidae (Old World babbler) genus Alcippe. But they are actually quite closely related to the parrotbills, and are thus now placed in the family Paradoxornithidae.

The genus contains the following eight species:
 Spectacled fulvetta, Fulvetta ruficapilla
 Indochinese fulvetta, Fulvetta danisi
 Chinese fulvetta, Fulvetta striaticollis
 White-browed fulvetta, Fulvetta vinipectus
 Grey-hooded fulvetta, Fulvetta cinereiceps
 Taiwan fulvetta, Fulvetta formosana 
 Manipur fulvetta, Fulvetta manipurensis
 Brown-throated fulvetta, Fulvetta ludlowi

References

 Collar, N.J. & Robson, Craig (2007): Family Timaliidae (Babblers). In: del Hoyo, Josep; Elliott, Andrew & Christie, D.A. (eds.): Handbook of Birds of the World, Volume 12 (Picathartes to Tits and Chickadees): 70-291. Lynx Edicions, Barcelona.

 
Fulvettas
Bird genera
Paradoxornithidae